Soyuz MS-20 was a Russian Soyuz spaceflight to the International Space Station (ISS) launched on 8 December 2021. Unlike previous Soyuz flights to the ISS, Soyuz MS-20 did not deliver any crew members for an ISS Expedition or serve as a lifeboat for any crew members on board the station. Instead, it was commanded by a single professional cosmonaut on board, and carried two space tourists represented by space tourism company Space Adventures, which had already successfully planned and executed eight space tourism missions to the ISS. The flight to reach the ISS took six hours.

Crew 
Cosmonaut Alexander Misurkin, a veteran of two long duration missions to the ISS, commanded the Soyuz, which has been modified to allow it to be flown by a sole cosmonaut.

Backup crew

Space tourists 
For some time, it was speculated that Austrian airline pilot Johanna Maislinger would take one of the two spaceflight participant seats, but on 13 May 2021, Space Adventures confirmed that Japanese art collector Yusaku Maezawa had acquired both seats, one for himself, with the other being taken by his production assistant, Yozo Hirano. This is the first time that two Japanese space fliers are launched together.

In July 2021, Space Adventures Moscow Office changed their previous story and said that Maislinger had never had access to the funds she had claimed, and they had never treated her as a serious candidate.

It was also reported for a time that Japanese entertainer Yumi Matsutoya was to fly on this space flight.

Notes 
Soyuz MS-20 marks the first flight of a space tourist to the International Space Station since Canadian space tourist Guy Laliberté launched onboard Soyuz TMA-16 in September 2009. British singer Sarah Brightman was originally scheduled to fly onboard Soyuz TMA-18M in 2015, although she cancelled her flight before launch.

Soyuz MS-20 also marks the first of at least two completely commercially dedicated Soyuz flights flown by Roscosmos, the second being Soyuz MS-23, which is scheduled for launch in October 2022 and will ferry one Russian cosmonaut and two commercial astronauts to the ISS for six months.

This flight also marks a departure from the traditional way space tourism has been done. On previous flights, the space tourist's mission would take place during either a "taxi" flight, where Soyuz lifeboats on the ISS were being swapped, allowing for a week or so-long mission, or during handover periods between crews, where the space tourist would launch with an incoming long-duration crew and land with the outgoing long-duration crew. Soyuz MS-20 is a departure from this model, as it involves a flight entirely dedicated to space tourism. American company Axiom Space also carried out a similar flight with SpaceX, where an Axiom-hired professional astronaut flew with three paying private astronauts to the ISS on board Crew Dragon Endeavour, on 8 April 2022.

References 

Crewed Soyuz missions
Spacecraft launched in 2021
2021 in Russia
Orbital space tourism missions
Fully civilian crewed orbital spaceflights
Spacecraft which reentered in 2021